Dorothy Dean (December 22, 1932 – February 13, 1987) was an African American socialite, connected to Andy Warhol's The Factory—for which she appeared in the films Batman Dracula (1964), Space (1965), My Hustler (1965), Afternoon (1965), and Chelsea Girls (1966)—and Max's Kansas City, where she worked as door person. She also appeared in the documentary film Superartist (1967) about Warhol and his films.

Biography
Dean was born in White Plains, New York, December 22, 1932. She graduated from Radcliffe and earned an MFA at Harvard, had a master's degree in art. While living in Cambridge, Massachusetts, she began associating almost entirely with gay white men, presumably in an effort to distance herself from the politics surrounding being both black and female in the 1950s and 60s, politics with which she did not identify.

She was loved for her strong, verbose personality, perhaps mostly for her playful phrasing and clever nicknames (Andy Warhol, to Dean, became "Drella," a combination of Dracula and Cinderella; James Baldwin was "Martin Luther Queen"). She rarely worked; she held brief editorial and proofreading positions at publications such as The New Yorker and Vogue magazines.

Death and legacy
She died of cancer in Boulder, Colorado on February 13, 1987.

Dean is one of the subjects of Hilton Als' 1996 book The Women.

References

External links
 
 Guide to the Joe Campbell Collection of Dorothy Dean Letters and Fales Library, New York University

1932 births
1987 deaths
Radcliffe College alumni
American socialites
American film actresses
African-American actresses
People from White Plains, New York
People from Cambridge, Massachusetts
Deaths from cancer in Colorado
20th-century American actresses
20th-century American people
20th-century African-American women
20th-century African-American people